Radzyń Podlaski  is a town in eastern Poland, about 60 km north of Lublin, with 15,808 inhabitants (2017). Situated in the Lublin Voivodeship since 1999, previously it was part of the Biała Podlaska Voivodeship (1975–1998). It is the capital of Radzyń Podlaski County, and historically belongs to the region of Lesser Poland (despite the adjective Podlaski, which suggests that it is part of another Polish province, Podlasie). The town was founded in 1468, and its most important landmark is the rococo Potocki Palace.

The town has the area of 20,29 square kilometers, of which forests make only 5%. It is located along the Expressway S19, which passes through Białystok, Lublin and Rzeszów.

History

In the early years of Polish statehood Radzyń was located in extreme northeastern corner of Lesser Poland, near the border with Podlachia, which often passed between Poland, Ruthenia and the Duchy of Lithuania. The region was frequently raided by its neighbors, which had a negative impact on the economy. This sparsely populated borderland of Lesser Poland began to see improvements after 1385, when Poland and Lithuania formed the Polish–Lithuanian union under the Union of Krewo. Settlers from other part of Lesser Poland, as well as Mazovia, came to Radzyń, churches were built and villages were founded. According to historical documents, the town of Radzyń was preceded by a settlement called Kozirynek (also spelled as Cozirynek and Kozyrynek; this name appears in documents as late as 1580).

In 1456, first Roman Catholic parish at Radzyń was created, and in 1468, the town was incorporated based on Magdeburg rights. It was a royal possession, leased by kings to different noblemen, such as the Mniszech family. In 1690, King John III Sobieski granted several privileges to town's residents. At that time, Radzyń had Roman Catholic, Greek-Catholic and Orthodox churches, as well as a synagogue. Radzyń was a private town, administratively located in the Lublin Voivodeship in the Lesser Poland Province of the Polish Crown. Since 1741 until the late 18th century, Radzyń belonged to the Potocki family. General Eustachy Potocki built a rococo palace here. His son Ignacy Potocki (1750–1809) was born here.

19th century
Following the Partitions of Poland at the end of the 18th century, Radzyń was annexed by Austria, then following the Austro-Polish War, in 1809, it was liberated by Poles and included within the short-lived Duchy of Warsaw, and after its dissolution, in 1815 it became part of Russian-controlled Congress Poland. Many inhabitants participated in the large Polish uprisings of 1830–1831 and 1863–1864. In 1867 Russian authorities created Radzyń County, which gave the town a boost. Later on, Radzyń got a rail connection with Lublin and Siedlce, and the town began a period of development.

World War I

During World War I, the town was occupied by Germany. In November 1918, Poland regained independence, and the occupying German forces opened fire on Poles who tried to liberate the town, but it was still reintegrated with the reborn Polish state. Within the Second Polish Republic, Radzyń was the seat of a county in Lublin Voivodeship. The town was briefly occupied by the Russians during the Polish–Soviet War in mid-August 1920, and recaptured by Poles on August 16, 1920. After a major fire in 1930, the houses on the market square, formerly from wood, were rebuilt of stone and brick.

World War II
During the joint German-Soviet invasion of Poland, which started World War II, on September 9, 1939, Radzyń was bombed by the Luftwaffe. In late September of that year, it was one of centers of Polish resistance, with units of Independent Operational Group Polesie stationed there for some time. The first Germans appeared in Radzyń after the Battle of Kock, in early October 1939.

In June 1940, during the AB-Aktion, the Germans carried out mass arrests of Poles, many of whom were afterwards imprisoned in the Lublin Castle and deported to concentration camps. From Radzyń, 6,000 local Jews were sent to Treblinka extermination camp in August 1942 amid gunfire and screams. Some went through the transit point in the Międzyrzec Podlaski Ghetto. The pacification actions were conducted by the Nazi German Reserve Police Battalion 101. The town was a major center of Home Army, with 4,200 members, and the German occupation lasted until July 23, 1944, when the Red Army entered the town. The Jewish community was never reconstituted.

Jewish community
Jews  settled in Radzyn Podlaski in the 16th century. In the 19th century, it became known as an important center of Jewish learning. The town had a Jewish population of 2,900 before World War II. It was home to the Radzyn Hasidic dynasty.

Sport
 Orlęta Radzyń Podlaski - football club

Landmarks
Among the local points of interest are the St. Trinity Church (1641), built in the so-called Lublin Renaissance style, as well as the Potocki Palace (1740s), built by a Polish-Italian architect Jakub Fontana. Its interior was destroyed twice: in 1915 by Imperial Russian troops, and in 1944 by the Wehrmacht during the occupation of Poland in World War II. The palace was in 1920 the headquarters of General Edward Rydz-Śmigły, during the Battle of Warsaw. Since 1920, it has served as office of local administration.

Notable residents

 Szymon Buchbinder (1853– ca.1908) a Polish painter of genre and historical scenes
 Zofia Grabczan (born 1962) a Polish politician was elected to the Sejm in 2005
 Max Helfman (1901-1963) a Polish-American Jewish composer and choral conductor; emigrated in 1909
 Dariusz Kowaluk (born 1996) a Polish 400m. sprinter, team gold medallist at the 2020 Summer Olympics
 Gershon Henoch Leiner (1839–1890) a rebbe of the Izhbitza-Radzin dynasty
 Shmuel Shlomo Leiner (1909–1942) the fifth Rebbe of the Izhbitza-Radzin dynasty
 Karol Lipiński (1790–1861) a Polish music composer and virtuoso violinist
 Ignacy Potocki (1750–1809) a Polish nobleman, a politician and writer.
 Eustachy Erazm Sanguszko (1768–1844) a Polish nobleman, general, military commander, diplomat and politician.

References

External links
 Official town website, Radzyn-Podl.pl
 News and prices - Radzyń Podlaski Iledzisiaj.pl

Cities and towns in Lublin Voivodeship
Radzyń Podlaski County
Lesser Poland
Lublin Voivodeship (1474–1795)
Siedlce Governorate
Lublin Governorate
Lublin Voivodeship (1919–1939)
1468 establishments in Europe
Populated places established in the 1460s
Holocaust locations in Poland
15th-century establishments in Poland
Reserve Police Battalion 101